Virginia Ruano Pascual and Paola Suárez were the defending champions, but Suárez did not participate due to injury. Ruano Pascual partnered Conchita Martínez, but lost in the first round to Jennifer Hopkins and Mashona Washington.

Svetlana Kuznetsova and Alicia Molik won the title, defeating Lindsay Davenport and Corina Morariu in the final 6–3, 6–4. This was Davenport's sixth and final appearance in the Women's Doubles final at the Australian Open; her loss in the final meant that she was not able to complete the Career Grand Slam in Doubles.

Seeds

  Nadia Petrova /  Meghann Shaughnessy (withdrew)
  Cara Black /  Liezel Huber (second round)
  Lisa Raymond /  Rennae Stubbs (second round)
  Conchita Martínez /  Virginia Ruano Pascual (first round)
  Janette Husárová /  Elena Likhovtseva (second round)
  Svetlana Kuznetsova /  Alicia Molik (champions)
  Anastasia Myskina /  Vera Zvonareva (semifinals)
  Elena Dementieva /  Ai Sugiyama (third round)
  Barbara Schett /  Patty Schnyder (first round)
  Li Ting /  Sun Tiantian (third round)
  Gisela Dulko /  María Vento-Kabchi (second round)
  Yan Zi /  Zheng Jie (first round)
  Francesca Schiavone /  Roberta Vinci (first round)
  Shinobu Asagoe /  Katarina Srebotnik (third round)
  Lindsay Davenport /  Corina Morariu (finals)
  Eleni Daniilidou /  Nicole Pratt (quarterfinals)

Draw

Finals

Top half

Section 1

Section 2

Bottom half

Section 3

Section 4

External links
 2005 Australian Open – Women's draws and results at the International Tennis Federation
 Official Results Archive (Australian Open) 
 Official Results Archive (WTA)

Women's doubles
Australian Open (tennis) by year – Women's doubles
2005 in Australian women's sport